Israeli Security Zone may refer to:
 The Israeli occupation of Southern Lebanon following the creation of the Free Lebanon State
 Philadelphi Route, a narrow strip of land between Gaza Strip and Egypt